Victoria is an unincorporated community in Preston County, West Virginia, United States.

An early variant name was Irondale.

References 

Unincorporated communities in West Virginia
Unincorporated communities in Preston County, West Virginia